Leon Rustamovich Sabua (born 1 September 2000) is a Russian professional footballer who plays as a centre forward for FC Urartu.

Club career
Sabua made his debut in the Russian Professional Football League for FC Krasnodar-2 on 10 March 2018 in a game against FC Chayka Peschanokopskoye. He made his Russian Football National League debut for Krasnodar-2 on 18 August 2018 in a game against FC Luch Vladivostok.

Sabua made his Russian Premier League debut for FC Krasnodar on 24 October 2020 in a game against FC Spartak Moscow. He substituted Magomed-Shapi Suleymanov in the 57 minute and scored a goal 2 minutes later to make the score 1–2. The game ended in a 1–3 home loss. Four days later he made his European debut as a late substitute in the Champions League 0–4 home loss to Chelsea.

On 4 July 2022, Armenian Premier League club FC Urartu announced the signing of Sabua.

Career statistics

Club

References

External links
 

2000 births
Russian people of Abkhazian descent
People from Gagra
Living people
Russian footballers
Association football forwards
Association football midfielders
FC Krasnodar-2 players
FC Krasnodar players
FC Urartu players
Russian Premier League players
Russian First League players
Russian Second League players
Russian expatriate footballers
Expatriate footballers in Armenia
Russian expatriate sportspeople in Armenia